Patrick Healey Jr. is a retired PBA Tour bowler and former Team India bowling coach. Healey was born in Niagara Falls, New York on October 9th, 1968. A PBA member from 1998-2007, he has accrued 172 national tournaments, and 28 television finals. He has 3 PBA titles to his credit, including one major, the 2003 PBA Dexter Tournament of Champions.

Healey started bowling on a fluke. According to Healey, his mother and father got him started. "They went out to bowl one evening when I was 8 years old, and they couldn't get a babysitter. So they just dragged me along. It turned out I liked it so much, that they enrolled me in a youth league the next year."

While attending Wichita State University, he became a first team All-American in 1988. However, because of college classes, Healey was forced to choose between bowling and his Computer Science major. "I was about a year and a half away from graduating with a degree in Computer Science. I remember walking into my counselor's office and saying that I just made the United States national bowling team, and I would be traveling a little bit. She basically looked at me and said, 'If you miss one laboratory class, you're out of the course for the semester.' I had reached a level in computer courses that it was make-or-break time. Obviously, I decided to bowl; I stayed in school but changed my major to general studies."

Although on the PBA tour since 1998, he did not win his first title until 2002, when he won the PBA Greater Kansas City Classic. Held at Lunar Bowl in Blue Springs, Missouri, he defeated Amleto Monacelli in the Wildcard Match, and  advanced to the semifinal to face Tommy Delutz, Jr., whom Healey defeated as well. In the title match, Healey defeated Michael Gaither by just sixteen pins. Healey has since won two more titles, including a major at the 2003 Tournament of Champions, and has lifetime tour earnings of $734,752.

After retiring from the PBA in 2007 due to an injury, Healey became a full-time bowling instructor and coach. He gives private classes, clinics and seminars. He has been the head coach of 5 different bowling federations, being Kuwait, the United Arab Emirates, Iraq, Guatemala, and India.

Amateur accolades 
 1986 Chuck Hall Star Of Tomorrow Recipient
 Graduate of Wichita State University
 Member of Wichita State University bowling team for all 4 years of college (1986-1990)
 1988 First Team All-American
 1991, 1992, & 1995 Team USA Member
 1991, 1992, & 1995 Amateur Bowler of the Year
 5-time World Championships Gold Medalist
 5-time Pan American Games Gold Medalist
 1995 World Cup Champion
 1995 & 1996 World Amateur Bowler of the Year
 1997 & 1998 Team All-Events Champion USBC National Tournament
 Numerous other national and international titles

Professional career titles 
 2002 PBA Greater Kansas City Classic - Lunar Bowl in Blue Springs, MO
 2003 PBA Geico Open - AMF Babylon Lanes West Babylon, NY
 2003 PBA Dexter Tournament of Champions - Mohegan Sun Arena in Uncasville, CT (Temporary Arena Lane Setting)

PBA earnings by year 
2007-08: Injury Deferment - Did Not Bowl
2006-07: $46,139
2005-06: $97,540
2004-05: $75,800
2003-04: $174,600
2002-03: $83,085
2001-02: $139,708
2000: $53,715
1999: $42,470
1998: $21,695
Total: $734,752

References 

1968 births
Living people
American ten-pin bowling players
Sportspeople from Niagara Falls, New York
Pan American Games medalists in bowling
Pan American Games gold medalists for the United States
Pan American Games silver medalists for the United States
Competitors at the 1991 Pan American Games
Competitors at the 1995 Pan American Games
Medalists at the 1991 Pan American Games
Medalists at the 1995 Pan American Games